Kul Sorkh or Kul-e Sorkh may refer to:
 Kul Sorkh, Chaharmahal and Bakhtiari
 Kul Sorkh, Khuzestan
 Kul Sorkh-e Lirasad, Khuzestan Province